Crete is a small unincorporated community in Greensfork Township, Randolph County, in the U.S. state of Indiana.

History
A post office was established at Crete in 1882, and remained in operation until it was discontinued in 1918. The community may have been named after the pet name of Lucretia, a local young woman.

Geography

Notable person
Jim Jones, leader of the Peoples Temple cult that committed mass murder in Jonestown, Guyana, in 1978, was born in Crete in 1931.

References

Unincorporated communities in Randolph County, Indiana
Unincorporated communities in Indiana